Smartish Pace is a non-profit, independent literary journal based in Baltimore, Maryland, USA. The magazine was founded in 1999 by Stephen Reichert who was a University of Maryland School of Law student at the time. The name, Smartish Pace, originates from a tort case in which a horse carriage, which was travelling at "a smartish pace," ran over and killed a donkey.  Smartish Pace has published poems by the following Pulitzer Prize or National Book Award winners: Martín Espada, Terrance Hayes, Rae Armantrout, Mark Doty, Natasha Trethewey, Philip Schultz, Claudia Emerson, Nathaniel Mackey, Ted Kooser, Paul Muldoon, Yusef Komunyakaa, Carl Dennis, Stephen Dunn, Mary Oliver, Andrew Hudgins, Henry Taylor, Gerald Stern, Maxine Kumin, and Anthony Hecht. The magazine has also debuted previously unpublished letters of Elizabeth Bishop and award-winning new translations of Tomas Tranströmer. When referencing places Pulitzer Prize winner Claudia Emerson had published, Newsweek called the journal "obscure". As of Clifford Garstang's 2022 Literary Magazine Rankings, Smartish Pace was ranked as one of the top ten poetry magazines in North America.

Smartish Pace’s website is the home of Poets Q & A, the first interactive poetry forum on the internet, where readers ask questions of well-known poets. Past poets who have participated in Poets Q & A include Carl Phillips, Sherman Alexie, Jorie Graham, Robert Creeley, Eavan Boland, Mark Doty, Robert Hass, Rae Armantrout, Carl Dennis, Stephen Dunn, Bob Hicok, Campbell McGrath, Robert Pinsky, Elizabeth Spires, and David Wojahn.

Smartish Pace was named "Best Poetry Journal" in 2007 by the Baltimore City Paper.

Masthead
Editor: Stephen Reichert
Senior Editor: Daniel Todd
 Associate Editors: Clare Banks, William Camponovo, Dan Cryer, Traci O'Dea, Freeman Rogers
 Assistant Editors: Samuel Cheney, Meg Eden, Jared Fischer, Kari Hawkey, Jocelyn Heath, Kristin Lindholm, Austin Tremblay, Clifford Williams

See also
List of literary magazines

Notes and references

External links
Smartishpace.com
Newpages.com (Sept. 2004), Review of Issue 10 of Smartish Pace

Annual magazines published in the United States
Poetry magazines published in the United States
Magazines established in 1999
Magazines published in Maryland
Poetry organizations
1999 establishments in Maryland